The Department of Housing and Construction was an Australian government department that existed between March 1983 and July 1987.

Scope
Information about the department's functions and/or government funding allocation could be found in the Administrative Arrangements Orders, the annual Portfolio Budget Statements and in the Department's annual reports.

The functions of the Department at its creation were:
Housing
Building Industry Planning
Execution and maintenance of Commonwealth Government Works
Design and maintenance of furniture, furnishings and fittings for the Commonwealth Government.

Structure
The Department was an Australian Public Service department, staffed by officials who were responsible to the Minister for Housing and Construction.

References

Housing and Construction
Ministries established in 1983
1983 establishments in Australia
1987 disestablishments in Australia